Ángel Luis Arambilet Álvarez (born September 16, 1957), generally known professionally as simply Arambilet, is a novelist, poet, screenwriter, painter, graphic artist and filmmaker of Spanish-Dominican descent.

Biography 
Arambilet was one of 34 people interviewed for The History of Computer Graphics and Digital Art Project. His work is mentioned in compArt | center of excellence digital art” (a project at the University of Bremen).

He has been awarded by the Ministry of Culture of the Dominican Republic with the National Short Story Award (The Cayenne petals, 1994) and National Novel Prize (Neguri's secret, 2006).

Literary works 
 Cayenne/Petals – Los pétalos de la cayena. (National Literary Prize) Dominican Republic: AH, 1993. 
 Secret Zone – Zona secreta. Santo Domingo, Dominican Republic: AH, 1994. 
 Homo sapiens. Santo Domingo, Dominican Republic: AH, 1994. 
 Quintet – Quinteto. Santo Domingo, Dominican Republic: AH, 1996. 
 Insects – Insectos. Santo Domingo, Dominican Republic: AH, 1997. 
 The Passion Book – El libro de las pasiones. Santo Domingo, Dominican Republic: AH, 2000. 
 Neguri's Secret – El secreto de Neguri. (National Literary Prize) Santo Domingo, Dominican Republic: Alfaguara Editorial Publishing House, 2005. 
 Guarocuya. Tarragona, Spain: CS, 2009. 
 Brief Stories – Historias Breves (1988–1998). Tarragona, Spain: CS, 2009. 
 The Passion Book II – El libro de las pasiones (II). Tarragona, Spain: CS, 2010. 
 Orifiel. Tarragona, Spain: CS, 2010. 
 Digital Art – Arte Digital (1949–1999). Tarragona, Spain: CS, 2011. 
 Chernobyl 25 (Essay and Poetics based on Pedro Farías Nardi photographs at Chernobyl disaster site). Tarragona, Spain: CS, 2011. 
 Consuelo (Marie Linda) (biographical novel). Santo Domingo, Dominican Republic: CS, 2017.

Screenplays and treatments 
 The golden manatee mystery – El misterio del manatí de oro. Santo Domingo, Dominican Republic: 2006. Safe Creative: 1010117549995
 Guarocuya. Santo Domingo, Dominican Republic: 2006. Safe Creative: 0907174135227
 The distant counterweight of the stars – El lejano contrapeso de los astros. Santo Domingo, Dominican Republic: 2007. Safe Creative: 010117550021
 Amín Abel. Santo Domingo, Dominican Republic: 2014. ONDA 4597-10, Safe Creative:1402040027099
 1916. Santo Domingo, Dominican Republic: 2014. Safe Creative: 1403130354040
 Nico Mota's Accordion – El acordeón de Ñico Mota. Santo Domingo, Dominican Republic: 2014. Safe Creative: 1402040027037
 Fons (La Chepa). Santo Domingo, Dominican Republic: 2014. Safe Creative: 1402040027020
 Two ways – Doble Sentido. Santo Domingo, Dominican Republic: 2014. ONDA: 4903-11
 Código Paz. Santo Domingo, Dominican Republic: 2014. ONDA: ND
 The loanshark – El prestamista. Santo Domingo, Dominican Republic: 2014. ONDA: ND
 Bachata gringa. Santo Domingo, Dominican Republic: 2015.  Safe Creative: 1509295258879
 DOC-108. Santo Domingo, Dominican Republic: 2015. ONDA: 6469-12
 The thousand year legacy. Santo Domingo, Dominican Republic: 2015. Treatment for Lantica Pictures.
 Rulin. Santo Domingo, Dominican Republic: 2017.  Safe Creative: 1711064751850
 Consuelo (Marie Linda). Santo Domingo, Dominican Republic: 2014. ONDA: 11694-20

Art exhibitions 
Arambilet: Ten years and five series (1989–1999). Casa Guayasamín, Santo Domingo, Dominican Republic:1999.
XIX ELJ Visual Arts Biennial. Centro León, Bienal Eduardo León Jimenes, Santiago, Dominican Republic: 2002.
Homo sapiens: Characters to hang. Galería DPI, Santo Domingo, Dominican Republic: 2002.
XXII National Visual Arts Biennial. Museo de Arte Moderno, Santo Domingo, Dominican Republic: 2003.
XX ELJ Visual Arts Biennial. Centro León, Bienal Eduardo León Jimenes, Santiago, Dominican Republic: 2004.
Colective, Palacio Consistorial. Santo Domingo, Dominican Republic: 2004.
XXIII National Visual Arts Biennial. Museo de Arte Moderno, Santo Domingo, Santo Domingo, Dominican Republic: 2005.
Colective itinerant: Artes/Miniaturas en portada. Viota Gallery, San Juan, Puerto Rico: 2006.
XXI ELJ Visual Arts Biennial. Centro León, Bienal Eduardo León Jimenes, Santiago, Dominican Republic: 2006.
Colective: Saatchi Online. Saatchi Gallery, London, UK: 2009.
Colective DART-09: XIII Conferencia Internacional sobre Visualización de la Información IV09. 2D Exhibiting artist with "Dots on the i's"; Universidad Pompeu Fabra, Barcelona, Spain: 2009.
Colective CGIV09: VI International Computerized Graphics, images and visualization Conference Tianjin, China: 2009.
Ebre Terra de Vent Colective. Palau Oliver de Boteller, Tortosa, Spain: 2010.
Colectiva fotográfica, Leica Oskar Barnack Award. Between real and surreal: The abstraction. Wetzlar, Germany: 2011.
Colectiva Fotográfica, Brangulí was here: How about you? – Centre de Cultura Contemporánea de Barcelona (CCCB), Spain: 2011.
XXVI National Visual Arts Biennial. Museo de Arte Moderno, Santo Domingo, Dominican Republic: 2011.

Filmography

References 

Dominican Republic film directors
Dominican Republic people of Basque descent
Dominican Republic people of Spanish descent
Dominican Republic graphic designers
Male novelists
People from Santo Domingo
White Dominicans
1957 births
Living people